Texas Country Weekend is a syndicated radio program that plays Texas country music.

It is broadcast from KCTI in Gonzales County, Texas.

References

External links

 Texas Country Weekend Homepage
 https://web.archive.org/web/20130515185056/http://www.kcti1450.com/

Texas country music
American country music radio programs